The Adel Bridge is located on the east edge of Adel, Iowa, United States.  The  span carried traffic on River Street over the Raccoon River.  The Dallas County Board of Supervisors received a petition to replace a deteriorating bridge at this location.  The old bridge had been built where ferry service had been initiated in 1850, three years after the town had been established.  They contracted with the King Iron Bridge and Manufacturing of Cleveland to build the two-span Pratt through truss bridge for $12,500.  It was a primary river crossing into Adel until 1932 when the U.S. Highway 6 bridge was completed not far to the south.  While it remains in place, it was closed to vehicular traffic in 2000.  The bridge was listed on the National Register of Historic Places in 2002.

Photo gallery

References

Bridges completed in 1882
Bridges in Dallas County, Iowa
Truss bridges in Iowa
Road bridges on the National Register of Historic Places in Iowa
National Register of Historic Places in Dallas County, Iowa
Pratt truss bridges in the United States